Manuela Schwesig (Frenzel, born 23 May 1974) is a German politician of the Social Democratic Party serving as Minister President of Mecklenburg-Vorpommern since 4 July 2017. She is the first woman to serve as head of government of this state. Previously she served as Federal Minister of Family Affairs, Senior Citizens, Women and Youth in the third cabinet of Angela Merkel from 2013 to 2017.

Early life and education
Born in Frankfurt (Oder), East Germany, Schwesig grew up in the nearby town of Seelow. In 1990, she played a small acting role in the DEFA film Forbidden Love, which had the title Verbotene Liebe in the original German and which was directed by Helmut Dziuba. After graduation in 1992 from the Gymnasium auf den Seelower Höhen, she completed studies in higher civil service (tax administration) of the federal state of Brandenburg. She attended the Training and Further Education Centre (Fachhochschule für Finanzen) in Königs Wusterhausen.

Political career

Career in local politics
Schwesig became a member of SPD in 2003, at the age 29. She subsequently served as a member of the Schwerin City Council from 2004 to 2008.

Career in national politics
Schwesig became a Federal Deputy Leader of the SPD on 13 November 2009 alongside Thorsten Schäfer-Gümbel and Olaf Scholz (and later Aydan Özoğuz and Ralf Stegner). She was then appointed State Minister of Social Affairs and Health in Mecklenburg-Vorpommern on 6 October 2008, under the leadership of Minister‐President Erwin Sellering. She served as minister and became member of the Landtag of Mecklenburg-Vorpommern from 4 September 2011 until she joined the federal government.

Ahead of the 2009 elections, German Foreign Minister Frank-Walter Steinmeier included Schwesig, then a relatively unknown face to the German public, in his shadow cabinet of 10 women and eight men for the Social Democrats' campaign to unseat incumbent Angela Merkel as Chancellor. During the campaign, Schwesig served as shadow minister for family affairs who advocated the party's family-friendly policies.

Schwesig was a SPD delegate to the Federal Convention for the purpose of electing the President of Germany in 2010, 2012, 2017 and 2022.

In 2011, Schwesig led high-level talks with Chancellor Angela Merkel and Labor Minister Ursula von der Leyen for the then-opposition Social Democrats on reaching a compromise over how to increase basic social welfare benefits for the unemployed.

Following the 2013 elections, Schwesig served as the Social Democrats' main negotiator in the working group for families, women and equal opportunities when Germany's two largest parties, Chancellor Angela Merkel's conservative bloc and the left-leaning Social Democrats, held talks on forming a broad coalition government.

Federal Minister of Family Affairs, 2013–2017
In the third Merkel cabinet, Schwesig, who at 39 was the youngest cabinet member, became the Federal Minister of Family Affairs, Senior Citizens, Women and Youth – a position also occupied by Merkel in her first cabinet post under German Chancellor Helmut Kohl in the early 1990s.

At an SPD convention in late 2015, Schwesig received 93 percent of members' ballots, the best result of any of the party leadership. Shortly after, the party's board mandated Schwesig and Thomas Oppermann with the task of drafting an electoral program for the 2017 federal elections.

Minister‐president of Mecklenburg-Vorpommern, 2017–present 
On 30 May 2017, Schwesig announced that she would seek the succession of Erwin Sellering as Minister‐president of Mecklenburg-Vorpommern. As consequence, she resigned as federal minister, the resignation taking effect on 2 June. On 4 July 2017, Schwesig became Minister‐president of Mecklenburg-Vorpommern.

As one of the state's representatives at the Bundesrat, Schwesig serves on the Committee on Foreign Affairs. She also chairs the German-Russian Friendship Group set up by the Bundesrat and the Russian Federation Council.

In the negotiations to form a fourth coalition government under Merkel following the 2017 federal elections, Schwesig led the working group on education policy, alongside Annegret Kramp-Karrenbauer, Stefan Müller and Hubertus Heil. 

Together with Doris Ahnen, Niels Annen, Oliver Kaczmarek and Anke Rehlinger, Schwesig co-chaired the SPD’s extraordinary 2018 convention, during which the party elected Andrea Nahles as its first-ever female leader.

From June 2019, Schwesig – together with her party colleagues Malu Dreyer and Thorsten Schäfer-Gümbel – was chosen as the SPD's interim leader, following former leader Andrea Nahles' decision to step down and leave politics. In September 2019, Schwesig announced she had been diagnosed with breast cancer and would step down from her duties at national level.

In 2019, she was appointed by the Federal Ministry of the Interior, Building and Community to serve on the committee that oversaw the preparations for the 30th anniversary of German reunification.

Schwesig led the SPD into the 2021 state election. Though the CDU had led the polls throughout 2020, the SPD experienced a major resurgence from July. By this time, Schwesig had established herself as a prominent and popular figure both within the state and across the country. The party's campaign was heavily based around her, running with the slogan "Die Frau für MV" ("the woman for Mecklenburg-Vorpommern"). The SPD a landslide victory with 39.6% of votes while the AfD, CDU, and Left all suffered losses. They chose to seek a coalition government with the Left, breaking the grand coalition with the CDU after fifteen years in power.

Political positions

Child protection
Schwesig is a member of the German Child Protection League. Her main focus is to fight child poverty and provide for good state childcare facilities. In 2009 she supported the idea promoted by Minister Ursula von der Leyen to block websites featuring child pornography.

On her order the employees of nursery schools in Mecklenburg-Vorpommern have to declare their commitment to uphold the principles of Germany's basic laws (the constitution).

Advancement of women

In 2014, Schwesig helped introducing a bill mandating compulsory quotas for women on the supervisory boards of the Germany's top companies, which was passed in early 2015. Also in early 2015, she called for a law that would force companies to allow female employees to see how their salaries compare with those of male colleagues. Meanwhile, she has been championing a substantial expansion of state-sponsored child care facilities.

In 2016, Schwesig successfully introduced changes to Germany's maternity protection legislation by expanding the laws to include groups of women not explicitly covered (including school and university students, women working as interns, and women pursuing vocational training) and attempting to reduce bureaucratic red tape.

Alongside Dietmar Woidke, Schwesig was instrumental in the Bundesrat's 2020 selection of Ines Härtel as the Federal Constitutional Court’s first judge from East Germany.

Political extremism
In a 2014 lawsuit before the Federal Constitutional Court of Germany, the far-right National Democratic Party of Germany (NPD) complained about comments made by Schwesig during that year's parliamentary election campaign for the state of Thuringia. In a newspaper interview, Schwesig had said: "The number one goal is that the NPD does not make it into the parliament." The NPD accused the minister of breaching her duty of neutrality and interfering with the campaign, and made a complaint before the Federal Constitutional Court. The court ruled in December 2014 that Schwesig did not damage the NPD's right to a level playing field because her comments fell under the "political struggle of opinion."

Controversy

Nord Stream 2
In her role as Minister President of Mecklenburg-Vorpommern she stated her strong support for the project; "We believe that it is right to build the pipeline. Nobody who is working on building the pipeline is doing anything wrong. The ones doing something wrong are those who are trying to stop the pipeline."   Her government created a foundation with the explicit goal, as written in its charter, of completing the Nord Stream 2 pipeline. Amid a 2020 diplomatic row over the construction of the Nord Stream 2 pipeline, three U.S. senators − Ted Cruz, Tom Cotton, and Ron Johnson – sent a letter to a Baltic Sea port operator in Schwesig's state, threatening the port's managers with “crushing legal and economic sanctions” if they continued to support the project servicing the Russian ships laying the pipe. In response, Schwesig called the letter "blackmail".

After the poisoning of opposition figure Alexey Navalny, she insisted it should have no effect on the construction of the pipeline. Ultimately, the project was cancelled after the 2022 Russian invasion of Ukraine. Furthermore, Schwesig was revealed to have been colluding with the Russians, allowing Gazprom to run PR for the pipeline via her office and modifying her public speeches in accordance with the Russian demands.

Manuela Schwesig was a member and, until its dissolution on 8 April 2022, the last chair of the German-Russian Friendship Group of the Federal Council. Her counterpart in the Russian group was Federation Council member and businessman Valery Ponomarev (senator).

She has been listed by Politico  among 12 Germans who got played by Putin.  

In February 2022, she lost a case against member of the Bundestag Christoph Ploß. She had demanded he limit his critique of her politics but the district court determined that it was well within allowed freedom of expression.

In January 2023, controversy arose over contacts Schewesig had with various people as part of Reuters research into Russian influence in Germany and German politics.  She had contact with Oleg Eremenko who had formerly worked for the Russian secret service (GRU) and now is the owner of a construction company in Berlin. Event records show Eremenko was in contact during 2016 with Igor Girkin, a colonel in the Russian military intelligence service GRU, who had played a leading role in the Russian intervention in the Donbas and the Russian annexation of Crimea in 2014. "Schwesig's spokesman Andreas Timm said ... that there had been 'no scheduled meeting' between the Prime Minister and Eremenko [and that] she took part in the event at the invitation of the city of Greifswald."

Other activities
 Franco-German Youth Office (FGYO), Ex-officio co-chair of the Board of Governors
 Friedrich Ebert Foundation (FES), Member
 Deutsche Telekom, Yes, I can! Initiative for Children and Young People, Member of the Board of Trustees
 Deutsches Museum, Ex-Officio Member of the Board of Trustees
 Plan International Deutschland, Member of the Board of Trustees
 Gegen Vergessen – Für Demokratie, Member
 German Association for the Protection of Children (DKSB), Member
 German Forum for Crime Prevention (DFK), Member of the Board of Trustees
 Mecklenburg State Theatre, Member of the Supervisory Board
 Total E-Quality initiative, Member of the Board of Trustees

Personal life
Schwesig is married and has two children.

She was diagnosed with breast cancer in September 2019 and subsequently resigned from her party offices at the federal level. She later confirmed that the cancer was curable and underwent medical treatment. On 12 May 2020, she announced that she had overcome the illness.

References

External links
 

1974 births
21st-century German politicians
21st-century German women politicians
Converts to Lutheranism
German Lutherans
Federal government ministers of Germany
Living people
People from Frankfurt (Oder)
People from Seelow
Ministers-President of Mecklenburg-Western Pomerania
Ministers for children, young people and families
Social Democratic Party of Germany politicians
Women federal government ministers of Germany
Women's ministers
Women Ministers-President in Germany
Women ministers of State Governments in Germany